The men's 100 metres event at the 2005 European Athletics U23 Championships was held in Erfurt, Germany, at Steigerwaldstadion on 14 and 16 July.

Medalists

Results

Final
16 July
Wind: 2.4 m/s

Heats
14 July
Qualified: first 3 in each heat and 2 best to the Final

Heat 1
Wind: -0.9 m/s

Heat 2
Wind: -2.0 m/s

Participation
According to an unofficial count, 16 athletes from 8 countries participated in the event.

 (1)
 (3)
 (2)
 (1)
 (3)
 (3)
 (1)
 (2)

References

100 metres
100 metres at the European Athletics U23 Championships